It's an Old Country is a 1967 novel by the British writer J.B. Priestley. An Australian visits England to find his long-lost father, encountering a range of different characters in his search.

References

Bibliography
 Klein, Holger. J.B. Priestley's Fiction. Peter Lang, 2002.

1967 British novels
Novels by J. B. Priestley
Heinemann (publisher) books